Robert Ward was an English scholar, a fellow of King's College, Cambridge and prebendary of Chichester Cathedral. He served in the "Second Cambridge Company" charged by James I of England with translating the Apocrypha for the King James Version of the Bible.

References
 Nicolson, Adam. (2003) Power and Glory (American title: God's Secretaries: The Making of the King James Bible) New York: HarperCollins 

Fellows of King's College, Cambridge
Translators of the King James Version